The Netherlands Environmental Assessment Agency published in 2010 a map of surface water bodies in the Netherlands. It distinguishes over 20 different types. There are water bodies with salty, brackish and sweet water; natural and artificial lakes by size, peat puddles and fens. The combined surface of the lakes larger than 50 hectares is 2,500 square kilometers. A comprehensive list of past and present lakes in the Netherlands is not available, selected lists are.

Groups of lakes 
There are several groups of lakes or lake systems that are frequently described as a whole. Examples are:

 Frisian Lakes, a group of 24 lakes in the province of Friesland
 Borderling lakes, a body of water surrounding the Flevopolder often divided in ten parts or lakes

Lakes 
The following is a list of lakes of the Netherlands.

Ancient lakes 
The waterscape of the Netherlands is in continuous change. The following is a list of historical lakes in the Netherlands:

 Haarlemmermeer
 Lake Almere

 Lake Flevo
 Purmer

References 

Netherlands
Lakes